Muthulingam may refer to:

 Muthulingam (poet)
 Muthulingam Kasiraj, an Indian doctor
 Appadurai Muttulingam, a Sri Lankan Tamil author and essayist

Tamil masculine given names